Sebastian Ridley-Thomas (born August 12, 1987) is an American politician who served in the California State Assembly. A Democrat, he represented the 54th Assembly District, which includes the Los Angeles County communities of Century City, Culver City, Westwood, Mar Vista, Palms, Baldwin Hills, Windsor Hills, Ladera Heights, View Park, Crenshaw, Leimert Park, Mid City, and West Los Angeles.

He was elected to office on December 3, 2013 to fill the 54th Assembly District seat vacated by Holly Mitchell upon her election to the California State Senate. He resigned from office December 31, 2017. Prior to his election to the Assembly in 2014, he was an aide for former State Senator Curren Price. He is the son of longtime Los Angeles politician Mark Ridley-Thomas.

Early life and education
Ridley-Thomas is the son of Avis Ridley-Thomas and Mark Ridley-Thomas, a member of the Los Angeles City Council. He earned a Bachelor of Arts degree in Sociology from Morehouse College.

California State Assembly
During his tenure in the Assembly, Ridley-Thomas chaired the Elections & Redistricting and Revenue & Taxation committees, as well as the Select Committee on Mental Health. He was also a member of the Assembly Appropriations, Rules, Joint Rules, Health, Water, Public Safety, Local Government, Public Safety, Public Employment & Retirement, and Labor & Employment committees.

Sexual harassment allegations and resignation 
On December 27, 2017, Ridley-Thomas announced that he would resign from the State Assembly on December 31.  He cited unspecified health problems in his statement and said he would need "an extended period of time to recuperate.

In August 2018, the Los Angeles Times reported that Ridley-Thomas was "the subject of two sexual harassment complaints at the time he stepped down from the Legislature last year."  An Assembly investigation released on January 16, 2019 concluded that Ridley-Thomas likely made an unwanted sexual advance toward a female Capitol staffer two years prior.

According to the LA Times reporting:Ridley-Thomas was already raising money for reelection to a third full term. Late in November 2017, the Assembly Rules Committee informed him that an investigation into a complaint was underway, according to correspondence reviewed by The Times. Two sources familiar with the investigation said the complaint was about alleged unwanted physical contact of a sexual nature but did not disclose details of the allegation. A second sexual harassment complaint, by a different person, was filed around the same time ...

Ridley-Thomas resumed some political work just weeks after resigning. In February, he registered a new consulting business, Millennial Advisors. The firm has collected more than $80,000 from the African American Voter Registration, Education and Participation Project, a political action committee founded by his father. The fees cover consulting, office expenses and advertising. A related AAVREP committee specially formed to support Gavin Newsom's bid for governor —mostly backed by donations from labor unions — listed Sebastian Ridley-Thomas as treasurer and paid his Millennial Advisors firm more than $27,000.

He also joined the faculty of USC, which sits in his father's district and with which the supervisor has had a long and close relationship. USC appointed him "professor of practice of policy and social work" this spring ... In addition, the university gave him a scholarship to study for a master's degree in social work.

The unusual arrangement has come under scrutiny in recent weeks as the scandal-plagued university attempts to adopt more transparency in its affairs. Administrators launched an investigation and Sebastian Ridley-Thomas was fired [in July]. ... After the internal probe, USC approached the U.S. Attorney's office in Los Angeles. The university told federal prosecutors it had concerns about a recent $100,000 donation from a campaign fund controlled by Mark Ridley-Thomas.

The gift to USC's Suzanne Dworak-Peck School of Social Work ended up in the account of a nonprofit group [known as the Policy, Research and Practice Initiative] outside the university run by Sebastian Ridley-Thomas, according to sources and public records.

On October 13, 2021, the United States Attorney for the Central District of California announced that a federal grand jury had indicted Ridley-Thomas's father and former USC Dean of Social Work Marilyn L. Flynn for "a bribery scheme in which [Sebastian Ridley-Thomas] received substantial benefits from the university in exchange for Ridley-Thomas supporting county contracts and lucrative contract amendments with the university..."

Electoral history

2014 California State Assembly election

2016 California State Assembly election

Notes

External links
Join California Sebastian Ridley-Thomas

Democratic Party members of the California State Assembly
Morehouse College alumni
Living people
1987 births
African-American state legislators in California
Politicians from Los Angeles
21st-century American politicians
21st-century African-American politicians
20th-century African-American people